The United Front was formally launched in South Africa in 2015, following a preparatory activities in 2014, including a summit in November of 350 delegates representing labour unions, social movements and popular organisations, faith-based organisations, NGOs and anti-capitalist formations. It was launched with the  support of the National Union of Metalworkers of South Africa (NUMSA), which severed ties with the African National Congress and South African Communist Party at its December 2013 congress and to foster left-wing alternatives. While NUMSA defined itself as Marxist-Leninist, it envisaged the United Front as open to a range of forces, and as distinct from NUMSA itself. Significant differences of opinion emerged in the United Front from an early stage. The United Front effectively supplanted the Democratic Left Front, a smaller formation which had been established in 2011, itself founded following the collapse of the Anti-Privatisation Forum. Given the connection to NUMSA, both the Congress of South African Trade Unions (COSATU) which had expelled NUMSA, and the South African Communist Party, remained outside the United Front, the party proposing an alternative "left popular front" (LPF).

References

Political organisations based in South Africa
Socialism in South Africa
Socialist organizations